Derovere is a comune (municipality) in the Province of Cremona in the Italian region Lombardy, located about  southeast of Milan and about  east of Cremona.

Derovere borders the following municipalities: Ca' d'Andrea, Cappella de' Picenardi, Cella Dati, Cingia de' Botti, Pieve San Giacomo.

References

Cities and towns in Lombardy